Ioamnet Quintero Alvarez (born September 8, 1972 in Havana, Cuba) is a former high jumper from Cuba.

Biography
She won the bronze medal in the women's high jump contest at the 1992 Summer Olympics and also competed at the 1996  and 2000 games. She won a gold medal at the 1993 World Championships in Athletics.

International competitions

See also
Female two metres club

Notes

References

External links
 
 
 Picture of Ioamnet Quintero

1972 births
Cuban female high jumpers
Athletes (track and field) at the 1992 Summer Olympics
Athletes (track and field) at the 1996 Summer Olympics
Athletes (track and field) at the 2000 Summer Olympics
Athletes (track and field) at the 1991 Pan American Games
Athletes (track and field) at the 1995 Pan American Games
Living people
Olympic athletes of Cuba
Olympic bronze medalists for Cuba
Athletes from Havana
World Athletics Championships medalists
Medalists at the 1992 Summer Olympics
Pan American Games gold medalists for Cuba
Olympic bronze medalists in athletics (track and field)
Pan American Games medalists in athletics (track and field)
World Athletics Championships winners
Competitors at the 1994 Goodwill Games
Medalists at the 1991 Pan American Games
Medalists at the 1995 Pan American Games
20th-century Cuban women